Owl Creek is an unincorporated community in Cherokee County, North Carolina, United States, ten miles northwest of Murphy.  It was named by a family of Cherokee people who lived in the area, named uguku (owl).  They lost their land to the United States during Indian Removal.  Their family members still live in the surrounding counties.

Eastern Band of Cherokee Indians
Unincorporated communities in Cherokee County, North Carolina
Unincorporated communities in North Carolina